A bailar! is the second album of Spanish group Banghra after the success of their debut album La danza del vientre. Two singles were released from the album: "Una especie en extincion" and "Unidos".

Track listing
 Una Especie En Extincion (3:51)
 Unidos (3:14)
 Babylon (3:55)
 Bore-Nâ (3:00)
 City Light (3:21)
 Give It Away (4:36)
 Mi camino negro (3:20)
 No Time (3:50)
 Sin ti (3:44)
 Quedate aqui (3:17)
 13th Street (3:20)
 Una Especie En Extincion (Radio Edit)
 Unidos (Radio Edit)
 City Light (Radio Edit)
 Mi Camino Negro (Radio Edit)

Charts
It was released on Vale Music in July 2008 and reached #54 in August 2008.

References

2008 albums
Spanish-language albums
Banghra albums
Vale Music albums